Dendrobias steinhauseni is a species of beetle in the family Cerambycidae.  It was described by Hüdepohl in 1987.

References

Trachyderini
Beetles described in 1987